Solent University Football Club are a football club attached to Solent University, and are based in Southampton, Hampshire. The club is affiliated to the Hampshire Football Association, is a FA Charter Standard club  and from 2011 to 2020 were members of the Wessex League.

History
The club was a founder member of the Hampshire Premier League in 2008. They were winners of the Hampshire Premier League Cup in 2008 and the Southampton Senior Cup in 2009. The club finished runners-up in the Hampshire Premier League in 2009–10 and 2010–11, winning promotion to the Wessex League Division One. In the 2014–15 season, Team Solent were promoted to the Wessex Premier Division, after winning the Wessex Division One for the first time. In 2016 Team Solent won the Wessex League Cup beating Newport IOW 1–0 in the final with a goal from Toby Adekunle.

On 10 June 2020, Solent University withdrew from the Wessex League citing the "changing landscape of Higher Education which has caused a realignment of the priorities and the desire to support other sporting ambitions" as the reason for this decision.

Ground
The club's home ground is Test Park Sports Ground, Lower Brownhill Road, Southampton SO16 9QZ.

Honours
Hampshire Premier League
Runners-up 2009–10, 2010–11
Hampshire Premier League Cup
Winners 2008–09, 2010–11
Wessex Division One
Winners 2014–15
Southampton Senior Cup
Winners 2008–09, 2010–11, 2014–15, 2015–16
Sydenhams Wessex League Cup
Winners 2015–16

References

External links

 Hampshire Premier League page on Team Solent

Sport in Southampton
Football clubs in England
Wessex Football League
Football clubs in Hampshire
University and college football clubs in England